Kristian Traychev Dimitrov (born 27 February 1997) is a Bulgarian professional footballer who plays as a defender for Levski Sofia and the Bulgarian national team.

Club career

Botev Plovdiv 
In the summer of 2013, Dimitrov joined Botev Plovdiv at under-17 level from Lokomotiv Plovdiv and progressed through the club's academy system.

Dimitrov made his first-team debut on 13 March 2016, when he came off the bench to replace Serkan Yusein in the 81st minute of a 3–1 league win over Cherno More Varna. His first senior goal came in the last round of the 2015–16 season; he scored the second goal in a 2–1 win over Ludogorets Razgrad on 27 May.

Dimitrov began to establish himself in the Botev first team from the 2016–17 season, making eight league starts. On 8 June 2017, he signed a new two-year contract with the club.

On 5 February 2018, Dimitrov joined Second League club Montana on loan for the remainder of the 2017–18 season. He made 13 appearances in total. His only goal came on 5 May 2018 when he opened the scoring in a 2–0 away win over Botev Galabovo.

In June 2018, Dimitrov returned to Botev and continued his progress during 2018–19, becoming a regular in the defence. On 24 April 2019, he scored a last-minute goal against CSKA Sofia, bringing the score to 3:3 and enabling his team (which had been reduced to nine men) to progress to the final of the Bulgarian Cup 6:5 on aggregate.

Hajduk Split and the loan to CFR Cluj 
On 11 February 2020, it was announced that Dimitrov had signed a two-and-a-half year contract with Hajduk Split. 

Not finding much playing time in the 2021/22 season, he was loaned out to CFR Cluj in February 2022. He became a Liga I champion with the Romanian club, featuring in a single game, 3-1 loss against FCSB, scoring in the 45th minute.

Returning to Hajduk, he spent the first part of the 2022/23 season largely on the bench, starting a single cup match, a 5-1 away win against Tehničar Cvetkovec, where he received a red card for a counter-attack stopping foul in the 33rd minute, and his contract was terminated by mutual consent on December 17th 2022. Dimitrov had scored 3 goals in 40 league matches at the Croatian club.

Levski Sofia 
On 30 December 2022, Dimitrov returned to Bulgaria, signing a one-and-a-half year deal with Levski Sofia.

International career 
In May 2019, following his good performances for Botev, Dimitrov was called up to the national team by new manager Krasimir Balakov. On 7 June 2019, he made his debut, playing the full 90 minutes in the 1–2 away loss against the Czech Republic in a Euro 2020 qualifier.

Career statistics

Club

International stats

International goals
Scores and results list Bulgaria's goal tally first.

Style of play 
Krasimir Balakov compared Dimitrov with the legendary Bulgarian defender Trifon Ivanov, while being manager of Bulgaria.

Honours

Club
Botev Plovdiv
Bulgarian Cup: 2016–17
Bulgarian Supercup: 2017

CFR Cluj
Liga I: 2021–22

Hajduk Split
Croatian Cup: 2021–22
Croatian Super Cup runner-up: 2022

Individual
Bulgarian First League Defender of the Season: 2018–19

References

External links
 
 

Living people
Footballers from Plovdiv
1997 births
Bulgarian footballers
Bulgaria under-21 international footballers
Bulgaria youth international footballers
Bulgaria international footballers
Bulgarian expatriate footballers
Botev Plovdiv players
FC Montana players
HNK Hajduk Split players
CFR Cluj players
First Professional Football League (Bulgaria) players
Second Professional Football League (Bulgaria) players
Croatian Football League players
Expatriate footballers in Croatia
Association football defenders